Blood Money is the seventh studio album by Mobb Deep, released on May 2, 2006. It is the group's only album on G-Unit & Interscope. It features guest appearances by G-Unit and Nyce. The album also features artists Mary J. Blige and Nate Dogg. Blood Money is the 1st Mobb Deep studio album to not feature Big Noyd.

Critical reception 

Blood Money has received generally mixed reviews from music critics. At Metacritic, which assigns a normalized rating out of 100 to reviews from mainstream critics, the album received an average score of 55, based on 17 reviews, indicating "mixed or average reviews".

Commercial performance 
In the United States, the album debuted at #3 on the Billboard 200 selling 106,000 units in its first week of release. This entry at #3 on the Billboard 200 tied Mobb Deep's 4th album Murda Muzik for highest entry on the chart, with Murda Muzik entering the chart at #3 in 1999.

The album has sold 500,000 copies in the United States and went Gold.

Track listing

The bonus track "Have a Party" originally appeared on the Get Rich or Die Tryin soundtrack, released in 2005. The other bonus track on the album, "Outta Control Remix", also originally appeared elsewhere, appearing as a bonus track on the re-release edition of 50 Cent's The Massacre. "Outta Control Remix" was also released as a single off of The Massacre and peaked at #6 on the Billboard Hot 100.

Samples 
"Stole Something" contains samples from "Puella Puella" by Man.

"Creep" contains samples from "Dil Tha Akela Akela" by Lata Mangeshkar.

"Speakin' So Freely" contains samples from "Solitude of the Mountains" by Gil Flat.

"Give It to Me" contains samples from "Tujhe Yaad Na Meri AA Yee" by Jatin–Lalit.

"Click Click" contains samples from the Knight Rider theme.

"Pearly Gates" contains samples from "The Judgement Day" by Tavares.

"The Infamous" contains samples from "Gangbusters" - written by F. Brathwaite - Scratch Mix by Grand Wizzard Theodore.

"It's Alright" contains samples from "The Loneliest Man In Town" by Side Effect.

"Have A Party" contains samples from "I Love Rock 'n' Roll" by Joan Jett and the Blackhearts.

Charts

Weekly charts

Year-end charts

References 

2006 albums
Albums produced by the Alchemist (musician)
Albums produced by Exile (producer)
Albums produced by Havoc (musician)
Albums produced by Dr. Dre
Albums produced by J. R. Rotem
Albums produced by Fredwreck
G-Unit Records albums
Mobb Deep albums
Interscope Records albums